Mananara Nord or Mananara Avaratra is a commune in Madagascar. It belongs to the district of Mananara Nord, which is a part of Analanjirofo Region. The population of the commune was  35,148 in 2018.

It is situated at the Route Nationale No.5 between Maroantsetra and Toamasina.

Mananara Nord is served by a local airport and maritime harbour. It also has riverine harbour at the Mananara River (Analanjirofo) that is located in the East of the town center. 

In addition to primary schooling the town offers secondary education at both junior and senior levels. The town provides access to hospital services to its citizens.

The majority 50% of the population of the commune are farmers.  The most important crop is cloves, while other important products are coffee and vanilla.  Services provide employment for 40% of the population. Additionally fishing employs 10% of the population.

Nature
The Mananara-Nord National Park is near this city.

References and notes 

Populated places in Analanjirofo
Biosphere reserves of Madagascar